Rivers State College of Health Science and Management Technology (RIVCOHSMAT) is a public higher education institution in Port Harcourt, Rivers State, Nigeria. It was established under the College of Health Science and Technology Law (2001). It consists of School of Health Technology, School of Public Health Nursing, School of Nursing and School of Midwifery.

Admission requirements
RSCHST is open to all regardless of gender, race, color, creed or national origin. There's a minimum entry age of 16 years. Candidates for the college's certificate programs are required to pass the entrance exam. Diploma programs usually require JAMB score. If admitted to any, candidates may be called to submit themselves for interview or further examinations where applicable.

Programs
The following programs are offered in the college
Anesthetic Technician Programm (Certificate): 2 years
Biomedical Engineering Technology Programme (National Diploma): 2 years
Community Health Extension Workers Programme (Diploma): 3 years
Dental Surgery Technician/Dental Health Technician Programme (Diploma): 3 years
Dispensing Opticianry Technician Programme (Diploma): 3 years
Emergency Medical technician (Diploma): 3 years
Environmental Health Technicians (Diploma): 3 years
Environmental Health Technology (Higher National Diploma): 4 years
Health Information Management (Abridgement): 1 year
Health Information Management (Professional Diploma): 3 years
Health Promotion and Education (Diploma): 2 years
Hospital/Health Administration (Diploma): 2 years
Junior Community Health Extension Workers Programme (Certificate): 2 years
Medical Laboratory Technician Programme (Abridgment): 2 years
Medical Laboratory Technician Programme (Certificate): 3 years
Medical Social Work (Diploma): 3 years
Pharmacy Technician Programme (Diploma): 3 years
Public Health (Diploma): 2 years
Public Health Nursing (HND): 2 years
Public Health Nursing Abridgement (Refresher) programme (HND): 1 year

See also
Rivers State College of Arts and Science
Rivers State Polytechnic
Rivers State University of Education
Bauchi State College of Nursing and Midwifery

References

External links

2000s establishments in Rivers State
2001 establishments in Nigeria
Educational institutions established in 2001
Health sciences schools in Nigeria
Science schools in Rivers State
Technological universities in Nigeria
Universities and colleges in Port Harcourt
Public universities in Nigeria